During the 1951–52 season Juventus Football Club competed in Serie A and the Latin Cup.

Summary 
The bianconero club saw a moving summer due to disagreements between Juventus chairman and manager Carver, who exploded in an interview with Gazzetta dello Sport just before the preseason in August, demanding the selling of the Hansen brothers, John and Præst, and buying Benito Lorenzi from Inter. The response of chairman Gianni Agnelli was the dismissal of the English manager. The team new replacement was Hungarian György Sárosi, with contract in the United States until December; meanwhile, Gianpiero Combi and Luigi Bertolini were interim managers.

During the Serie A season, Hansen scored 30 goals, earning him the "Capocannoniere" Italian top goal-scorer title, along with the squad reaching a massive total of 98 goals scored and helping Juventus to win its 9th domestic title.

Squad

Competitions

Serie A

League table

Matches

Latin Cup

Semifinals

3rd place

Statistics

Squad statistics

Players statistics

Appearances
24.Alberto Bertuccelli
10.Romolo Bizzotto
2.Enrico Boniforti
33.Giampiero Boniperti
5.Emilio Caprile
4Filippo Cavalli
17.Giuseppe Corradi
24.Rino Ferrario
36.John Hansen
31.Karl Aage Hansen
33.Sergio Manente
31.Giacomo Mari
30.Ermes Muccinelli
15.Carlo Parola
34.Alberto Piccinini
35.Karl Aage Præst
1.Ermanno Scaramuzzi
34.Giovanni Viola
19.Pasquale Vivolo

Goalscorers
30.John Hansen
19.Giampiero Boniperti
17.Ermes Muccinelli
12.Karl Aage Hansen
12.Pasquale Vivolo
3.Karl Aage Præst
2.Emilio Caprile
2.Giacomo Mari
1.Carlo Parola

References

External links 
 
 
 

Juventus F.C. seasons
Juventus
Italian football championship-winning seasons